The following events occurred in January 1961:

January 1, 1961 (Sunday)
The British farthing coin, used since the 13th century, and worth 1/4 of a penny, ceased to be legal tender.
Australia became the second nation to permit the sale of the birth control pill, and the first to allow the Scherer oral contraceptive, with brand name of Anovlar. The G.D. Searle pill Enovid had been permitted in the United States in May 1960.

January 2, 1961 (Monday)
Cuba's Prime Minister, Fidel Castro, demanded that the United States Embassy in Havana reduce its staff from 87 to no more than 11 no later than Wednesday.  U.S. President Eisenhower ended diplomatic relations with Cuba the next day.
In the Rose Bowl, the #1 ranked University of Minnesota Gophers were upset by the #6 ranked University of Washington Huskies, 17–7, before a crowd of 97,314 fans in Pasadena.  The loss, however, did not affect Minnesota's recognition as the unofficial champion of the 1960 NCAA University Division football season, since the final AP and UPI polls were taken prior to the postseason bowl games.

January 3, 1961 (Tuesday)
In the worst airplane crash in the history of Finland, all 25 persons on Aero OY Flight 311 died when the DC-3 crashed shortly after takeoff from Vaasa while en route to Kronoby. A subsequent investigation concluded that both the pilot and co-pilot had been drinking as recently as five hours before takeoff.
U.S. Marines, guarding the United States Embassy in Cuba, lowered the American flag for the last time for what would be more than half a century, as the Embassy closed and the United States and Cuba severed diplomatic relations. On August 14, 2015, the three Marines who had lowered the flag—Larry Morris, James Tracey, and Francis "Mike" East—would be present at the Embassy and would hand the same flag to three new U.S. Marine guards to be raised again.
The 87th United States Congress began, with the Democratic Party having a 65 to 35 majority in the U.S. Senate, and 263 to 174 majority in the House of Representatives, although Southern Democrats in 11 states from the Deep South (100 representatives and 21 senators) were conservative.
The Space Task Group, charged by NASA to conduct Project Mercury and other human spaceflight programs, officially became a separate NASA field element directly under NASA Headquarters. Prior to this time, the Space Task Group was organized under the Goddard Space Flight Center and was administratively supported by the Langley Research Center. As of this date, the personnel strength of Space Task Group was 667.
At the United States National Reactor Testing Station near Idaho Falls, Idaho, the atomic reactor SL-1 exploded, killing three military technicians.

January 4, 1961 (Wednesday)
East Germany's Chancellor and Communist party chief, Walter Ulbricht, held a secret emergency meeting of the Politburo of his Socialist Unity Party of Germany, the SED, and told his fellow party leaders that East Germany's own economic failures accounted for 60% of the departure of East Germans to West Germany.  He warned the SED that the nation needed to take action to fix housing shortages, low wages, inadequate pensions, and the six-day workweek before the end of the year.  Ulbricht also criticized East German schools, pointing out that 75% of the people who left were younger than 25.  Most importantly, he created a task force to stop the loss of refugees; the solution would come in the form of the Berlin Wall and the heavily-guarded border in August.  
Michael Goleniewski, an officer of Poland's Army counter-espionage unit GZI WP (Główny Zarząd Informacji Wojska Polskiego or "Main Directorate of Information of the Polish Army"), who also spied on Poland as a double agent for the Soviet Union's KGB, defected to the American CIA office in West Berlin, becoming, in effect, a triple agent.
Died: Erwin Schrödinger, 73, Austrian physicist and pioneer in quantum mechanics, 1933 Nobel laureate for his discovery of the Schrödinger equation.  In 1935, he would propose a popular analogy that is referred to now as Schrödinger's cat.

January 5, 1961 (Thursday)
Italian sculptor Alfredo Fioravanti went to the U.S. Consulate in Rome and signed a confession, stating that he had been part of a team that forged the Etruscan terracotta warriors in the Metropolitan Museum of Art.
On January 5 and 6, NASA's Space Exploration Program Council met in Washington, D.C., to discuss manned lunar landing. Among the results of the meeting was an agreement that NASA should plan an earth-orbital rendezvous program independent of, although contributing to, the crewed lunar program.
On January 5 and 6, McDonnell Aircraft Corporation officials proposed to NASA a one-person space station consisting of a Mercury capsule and a cylindrical space laboratory capable of supporting one astronaut in a shirt-sleeve environment for 14 days in orbit. The complete vehicle, McDonnell said, could be placed in a  orbit by an Atlas-Agena booster, thus affording NASA what the company termed a "minimum cost manned space station."
Mister Ed, one of the first "fantasy sitcoms" on American television, premiered as a syndicated TV program and would be picked up by the CBS network beginning on October 1. The show, about a talking horse, was similar in concept to the Francis the Talking Mule film comedies of the 1950s and starred Alan Young as Wilbur Post, and Allan "Rocky" Lane as the voice of the horse. "Mister Ed" was portrayed by an American saddlebred horse, Bamboo Harvester. The show ran for five years, ending on February 6, 1966.

January 6, 1961 (Friday)
John F. Kennedy was formally elected as the 35th president of the United States, as a joint session of the U.S. Congress witnessed the counting of the electoral vote.  U.S. Vice-President Richard Nixon, who had opposed Kennedy in the 1960 election, formally announced the result, saying, "I now declare John F. Kennedy elected president."  The results were 303 votes for Kennedy, 219 for Nixon, and 15 for U.S. Senator Harry F. Byrd, Jr.
Blamed on a person smoking in bed, a fire at a San Francisco hotel for the elderly killed 20 of the 135 residents.  Police charged the smoker, who escaped unhurt, with manslaughter.  He was released for lack of evidence, and would die of cirrhosis four months later.
Born: Georges Jobé, Belgian motocross rider, and five-time world champion between 1980 and 1992.

January 7, 1961 (Saturday)
In the first round of the Los Angeles Open golf tournament in the United States, golfing legend Arnold Palmer took 12 strokes to complete the 18th hole.  The defending Masters and U.S. Open champion hit his first four shots at the green out of bounds, for four penalties; it took two more strokes to reach the green, and, once there, two more to sink the ball.
After leading Duke 36–33 at halftime, North Carolina State's basketball team lost 81–67.  Months later, it was revealed that two N.C. State players had been paid $1,250 each by gamblers for point shaving.  The two were paid $2,500 each in the Wolfpack's 62–56 loss, on February 15, to North Carolina.
The NFL's first "Playoff Bowl", between the second-place finishers in the league's Eastern and Western Conferences, took place in Miami.  Officially, the game was called the "Bert Bell Benefit Bowl" and raised money for the NFL players' pension fund.  Playing a week after  Philadelphia beat Green Bay in the NFL championship, the Detroit Lions won third place in a 17–16 victory over the Cleveland Browns.
Following a four-day conference in Casablanca, five African chiefs of state announced plans for a NATO-type African organization to ensure common defense. From the Charter of Casablanca emerged the Casablanca Group, consisting of Morocco, the United Arab Republic, Ghana, Guinea, and Mali.

January 8, 1961 (Sunday)
In France, a referendum supported Charles de Gaulle's policies on independence for Algeria with a majority of 75% (17,447,669 to 5,817,775) in favor.

January 9, 1961 (Monday)
British authorities announced that they had discovered the Soviet Portland Spy Ring in London. Arrested on January 7 were Harry Houghton, Ethel Gee and Gordon Lonsdale.
In the former Belgian Congo, aides of jailed premier Patrice Lumumba formed the "Republic of Lualaba", in the valley of the Lualaba River.

January 10, 1961 (Tuesday)
The University of Georgia was forced to admit its first African-American students, after U.S. District Judge William Bootle ordered the U.Ga. to admit Charlayne Hunter and Hamilton E. Holmes.
Ali Amini, the Prime Minister of Iran, announced a program for land reforms, but was unable to implement the ideas because of disagreement with the Shah of Iran.
A committee chaired by Dr. Jerome Wiesner, professor of electrical engineering at MIT and John F. Kennedy's choice for science adviser, issued Report to the President-Elect of the Ad Hoc Committee on Space.
Died: 
Dashiell Hammett, 66, American detective novelist, creator of Sam Spade, Nick and Nora Charles, and The Continental Op
Isabel Paterson, 74, Canadian-born American journalist, political philosopher, and author of The God of the Machine

January 11, 1961 (Wednesday)
The University of Georgia admitted African-American students for the first time, five days after a federal judge ordered integration. Hamilton Holmes and Charlayne Hunter were the first to begin classes in Athens.
The Pisces, a yacht carrying Moroccan Jews to Israel, capsized off the coast of Algeciras, Spain, drowning the 40 passengers and all but 3 of the crew. The ship's captain survived.
Ukrainian SSR Communist Party Chief Nikolai Podgorny was berated by Soviet First Secretary Nikita Khrushchev after corn production fell short of goals set for 1960. In a session of the party's Central Committee in Moscow, Khrushchev accused Podgorny of lying to conceal theft and warned, "You will pay for this lack of leadership." Podgorny, along with Leonid Brezhnev and Alexei Kosygin, would be part of the troika that would overthrow Khrushchev in 1964.
The name Grampian Television was selected for independent television's new service covering the north of Scotland, replacing the name North of Scotland Television. The Grampian Mountains are one of three mountain ranges in Scotland.
The Naval Auxiliary Landing Field San Clemente Island was renamed "Frederick Sherman Field" in honor of Vice Admiral Frederick C. Sherman, a US naval commander of World War I and World War II.
USAF test pilot Jack B. Mayo disappeared over the Gulf of Mexico while test-firing M61 Vulcan cannons from a Republic F-105D Thunderchief. He was officially declared missing eight days later. In 1959 Mayo had been one of the 32 finalists for NASA Astronaut Group 1.
Born: 
Karl von Habsburg, former member of European Parliament for Austria, and eldest son of the last Crown Prince of Austria-Hungary, celebrated by monarchists since 2011 as the would-be Emperor Karl II; in Starnberg, West Germany 
Jasper Fforde, English novelist, in London
Lars-Erik Torph, Swedish rally driver (died 1989)

January 12, 1961 (Thursday)
Norwegian Olympic sailing champion Johan Ferner married Princess Astrid of Norway at Asker church near Oslo.
Born: Simon Russell Beale, English actor, in Penang state, Malaya.

January 13, 1961 (Friday)
General Cemal Gürsel, the President of Turkey since a May 27 coup, announced that the ban on political activity had been lifted and that parliamentary elections would be scheduled for October 15.
The former British Navy aircraft carrier HMS Vengeance was recommissioned into the Brazilian Navy as the Minas Gerais.
The United States and Brazil concluded a treaty of extradition at Rio de Janeiro, signed by Francisco Clementino de San Tiango Dantas (the Brazilian Minister of State for External Relations), and U.S. Ambassador to Brazil Lincoln Gordon.
Born: Julia Louis-Dreyfus, American actress and comedienne known for Saturday Night Live, Seinfeld, The New Adventures of Old Christine and Veep; in New York City as the daughter of billionaire Gérard Louis-Dreyfus
Died: 
Henry Morton Robinson, 62, American novelist, died of second-degree burns he had sustained on December 23 while taking a bath.
František Drtikol, 77, Czechoslovakian portrait photographer 
Lem Winchester, 32, American jazz musician, was accidentally killed "while demonstrating a gun trick that backfired".

January 14, 1961 (Saturday)
The Professional Footballers' Association, trade union for the soccer football players in the professional leagues of England and Wales, called off plans for a strike in the middle of the 1960–61 Football League season.  PFA director Jimmy Hill had threatened the strike after The Football League refused to lift a salary cap that limited even the best players to no more than £20 per game (twenty pounds sterling, comparable to £424 in 2017).  The English League relented, as "the threat of a strike effectively finished the era of the maximum wage".
In the final week of his administration, U.S. President Dwight D. Eisenhower issued an Executive Order that closed a loophole that allowed American people and companies to own gold outside of the United States.  Since 1933, people and companies under American jurisdiction were barred from buying, selling or owning gold within the U.S., but were not prohibited from hoarding it outside of the country.  The new order directed that all Americans who held gold coins, gold bars, and foreign gold securities and gold certificates, would have to dispose of their holdings no later than June 1.  The move came after the U.S. trade deficit had grown by ten billion dollars over the previous three years.
India's third nuclear reactor, ZERLINA, the Zero Energy Reactor for Lattice Investigations and New Assemblies, went into operation. The reactor had a maximum power of not more than 100 watts and was limited to research on "the properties of various types of nuclear fuels" and would be dismantled in 1983.
Born: Vissarion, Russian mystic who claims to be a reincarnation of Jesus Christ, as Sergei Anatolyevich Torop, in Krasnodar, Russian SFSR, Soviet Union
Died: Barry Fitzgerald, 72, Irish actor

January 15, 1961 (Sunday)
The collapse of an offshore radar tower off the coast of New Jersey killed all 28 men on board. Rescuers heard tapping from within the wreckage in the first day after the disaster, but were unable to reach the survivors. Only two bodies were found. Three U.S. Air Force officers were later charged with neglect of duty in connection with the accident.
Motown Records signed The Supremes to their first recording contract.

January 16, 1961 (Monday)
The Festival de Télévision de Monte-Carlo was launched by Rainier III, Prince of Monaco.
The United States banned travel by its citizens to Cuba, except in cases where a special endorsement was included on a passport.
The Mercury-Redstone 1A (MR-1A) postlaunch system evaluation tests were completed at Cape Canaveral. Data disclosed that the instrumentation system, communication system, and other components had operated satisfactorily during the flight mission.
In Sheldon, Iowa, bank teller Burnice Geiger was arrested after federal bank examiners discovered that she had embezzled money from the Sheldon National Bank. Initially, audits showed more than $120,000 missing over a three-year period. Mrs. Geiger admitted to stealing a total of $2,126,859.10 — an American record to that time, equivalent to $14 million fifty years later. Sentenced to 15 years in prison, she served five, and lived until 1981.

January 17, 1961 (Tuesday)
US President Dwight Eisenhower gave his farewell address on nationwide television, with the warning, "We must guard against the acquisition of unwarranted influence, whether sought or unsought, by the 'military-industrial complex'..We must never let the weight of this combination endanger our liberties or democratic processes."
The keel was laid for the American submarine USS Lafayette, at the shipyard of the Electric Boat Division of General Dynamics in Groton, Connecticut.
Died: Patrice Lumumba, 35, former leader of Republic of Congo, secretly executed by a firing squad

January 18, 1961 (Wednesday)
In what the Guinness Book of World Records listed under "Closest election", the general election in Zanzibar, the Afro-Shirazi Party (ASP) won 10 seats, and the Zanzibar Nationalist Party (ZNP) won 9.  Specifically, the seat for the constituency of Chake-Chake was won by the margin of one vote, with 1,538 for the ASP and 1,537 for the ZNP.
The Chaplain's Medal for Heroism, created especially for George D. Fox, Alexander D. Goode, Clark V. Poling, and John P. Washington, was awarded to them posthumously and presented to their next of kin by Wilber M. Brucker, U.S. Secretary of the Army, at a ceremony at Fort Myer.  On February 3, 1943, the "Four Chaplains" had given up their own lifejackets to save the lives of four soldiers on the troop transport , and then went down with the ship.
Born: Mark Messier, Canadian NHL  player, in Edmonton
Died: Thomas Anthony Dooley III, 34, American physician and humanitarian, from cancer

January 19, 1961 (Thursday)
In New Zealand, the filling of Lake Ohakuri began.
An Aeronaves de México DC-8B airline flight, bound for Mexico City, crashed shortly after taking off in a blizzard from New York's Idlewild Airport.

January 20, 1961 (Friday)
John F. Kennedy took the oath of office as the 35th president of the United States. For the first time, the event was shown on color television, pioneered by the NBC network.
Mercury spacecraft No. 14 was delivered to Wallops Island for the Little Joe 5A (LJ-5A) maximum dynamic pressure abort test.
Space Task Group management held a Capsule Review Board meeting. The first topic on the agenda was a follow-on Mercury program. Several types of missions were considered, including long-duration, rendezvous, artificial gravity, and flight tests of advanced equipment. The major conclusion was that a follow-on program needed to be specified in greater detail.

January 21, 1961 (Saturday)
Loaded with 16 nuclear tipped Polaris A-1 missiles, the submarine  completed its first "deterrent patrol", after having remained submerged for a record 66 consecutive days.
Hours after a speedy confirmation in a special session of the United States Senate, all ten members of President John F. Kennedy's cabinet were sworn into office in a ceremony at the White House, including the President's younger brother, Robert F. Kennedy, who became the new Attorney General.
The first Cosquín Festival, Argentina's major folk music festival, began.
Died: Blaise Cendrars, 73, Swiss/French novelist and poet

January 22, 1961 (Sunday)
The international Masonic organization CLIPSAS (Centre of Liaison and Information of Masonic Powers, Signatories of Appeal of Strasbourg) was formed in Strasbourg.
The first Coronda River Aquatic Marathon, a  swimming endurance race, took place in Argentina.
The American Ballet Center Company dance troupe, formed on October 1, 1956, began a 47-city tour with its new name, the Robert Joffrey Ballet, now known as the Joffrey Ballet.
Born: Luba Orgonasova, Slovak operatic soprano, in Bratislava

January 23, 1961 (Monday)
In Lebanon, the Political Bureau dissolved the militants' organization; William Hawi created the Regulatory Forces.
A group of 29 men, led by Portuguese rebel Henrique Malta Galvao, hijacked the cruise ship Santa Maria which was carrying 580 passengers and a crew of 360. The group had boarded with tickets at La Guaira, Venezuela, and then executed the attack at 1:30 am. One member of the crew was killed and several wounded. After putting the wounded ashore, the ship sailed with other ships trying to locate it. Galvao threatened to scuttle the ship if it was attacked. The crisis would end on February 2, as Galvao surrendered the ship at Recife, Brazil.

January 24, 1961 (Tuesday)
Three USAF officers were killed. One of the bombs went partially through its arming sequence, as five of its six safety switches failed. The one remaining switch prevented a 24 megaton nuclear explosion.
The plane had taken off from Jakarta en route to Bandung.  
Mel Blanc, the voice of Bugs Bunny and many other cartoon characters, was seriously injured in a head-on collision while driving in Los Angeles.  Blanc was in a coma for three weeks and was reported as killed in at least one newspaper (possibly the Hilo Tribune-Herald), but his versatile voice was unaffected, and he continued working until his death in 1989.
Marilyn Monroe was granted a divorce from playwright Arthur Miller, after filing an action in Ciudad Juárez, Mexico.
Died: Elsa the Lioness, 5, Kenyan-born lion who was the subject of the 1960 book and the 1966 film Born Free, after being raised by author Joy Adamson and returned to the wild.

January 25, 1961 (Wednesday)
In Washington, D.C. John F. Kennedy began a tradition by holding the first live presidential press conference.  Broadcast on all 3 TV networks at 6:00 pm EST, the event was attended by 418 reporters and watched by an estimated 60,000,000 viewers.  Kennedy announced that the Soviet Union had freed the two surviving crewmen of a USAF RB-47 reconnaissance plane shot down over the Barents Sea on July 1, 1960.
One Hundred and One Dalmatians, the 17th full-length animated film by Walt Disney, had its world premiere, at 8:00 pm at the Florida Theatre in St. Petersburg, Florida.
Acting to halt 'leftist excesses,' a six-member junta, headed by Colonel Julio Adalberto Rivera composed of 2 army officers and four civilians took over El Salvador, ousting another military junta that had ruled for three months.

January 26, 1961 (Thursday)
John F. Kennedy appointed Janet G. Travell as his physician, the first woman to hold this appointment.
Born: Wayne Gretzky, Canadian NHL star, in Brantford, Ontario

January 27, 1961 (Friday)
The Soviet submarine S-80, with a crew of 68, vanished in the Barents Sea. The wreckage of the S-80 was not discovered until more than seven years later.
Leontyne Price became the first African-American woman to sing a leading role at the Metropolitan Opera House in New York. Her performance as Leonora in Il trovatore received a 42-minute ovation.

January 28, 1961 (Saturday)
In Atlanta, United States, Malcolm X and Jeremiah Shabazz of the black supremacist Nation of Islam met secretly with representatives of the white supremacist Ku Klux Klan to discuss common interests, including preventing integration of the races.  NOI leader Elijah Muhammad and KKK leader J.B. Stoner had arranged the meeting, with the Klan agreeing to help the "Black Muslims" acquire land for resettlement.
In Gitarama, in the Belgian colony of Rwanda, a group of Hutu politicians declared an end to the Tutsi monarchy and the creation of a republic, with Dominique Mbonyumutwa as its first President.  Mbonyumutwa was replaced by Grégoire Kayibanda before Rwanda was granted independence in 1962.
The Smothers Brothers, comedians Tom and Dick Smothers, first appeared on US national television, as guests on the Tonight show, hosted by Jack Paar.
Bobo Brazil became the first African American to win a US National Wrestling Alliance title, pinning Dick the Bruiser in the heavyweight pro wrestling match at Detroit.
An indoor high school basketball game in Pennsylvania, US, was "rained out".  Cold air from an open window combined with heat in a gymnasium to create puddles of condensation on the floor.  The game was called with West Hazleton High leading McAdoo High, 31–29.

January 29, 1961 (Sunday)
Five days after arriving in New York after hitchhiking from Madison, Wisconsin, 21-year-old musician Bob Dylan met his idol Woody Guthrie.  After hearing Dylan sing, Guthrie is said to have remarked "He's a talented boy.  Gonna go far."   Dylan settled in Greenwich Village and found fame in the protest folk music.
The Irvine Company deeded 1,000 acres of land in Orange County to the regents of the University of California, creating the campus upon which University of California, Irvine would be built, and around which the city of Irvine, California would be formed.
Radio Hanoi announced in an English-language broadcast that the National Liberation Front of South Vietnam, popularly known as the Viet Cong, had been formed to overthrow the government there and to establish a regime similar to that in Communist North Vietnam.
In the finals of the 1961 European Figure Skating Championships, Sjoukje Dijkstra won gold for the second year in succession.  Dijkstra went on to win World Championship and Olympic gold, becoming one of the best-known female figure skaters of all time.
Died: Sir Geoffrey Jefferson, 84, British neurosurgeon

January 30, 1961 (Monday)
US President John F. Kennedy delivered his first State of the Union Address, a pessimistic outlook of the challenges posed in the Cold War.
President Kennedy approved a $41 million  counterinsurgency plan, drawn up for President Eisenhower by General Edward Lansdale, to help the government of South Vietnam resist communist aggression.  Designed to add 52,000 men to that nation's army and civil guards, the plan included provisions for American soldiers and military advisers to assist in the effort.
Disenchanted with life in the Soviet Union, American defector Lee Harvey Oswald wrote to President Kennedy's newly appointed U.S. Secretary of the Navy, John Connally, to ask for a reversal of Oswald's dishonorable discharge from the United States Marines.  The letter was never acted upon, and on November 22, 1963, Oswald would shoot both Kennedy and Connally.
Born: Dexter Scott King, African-American activist, in Atlanta
Died: 
Dorothy Thompson, 66, American journalist
Arthur Milgram, 47, American mathematician

January 31, 1961 (Tuesday)
Hermann Höfle, an Austrian-born member of the Nazi Party who had overseen the deportation of Poland's Jews to extermination camps, was arrested in Salzburg shortly after being identified as a war criminal by Adolf Eichmann during Eichmann's war crimes trial. For nine years, Höfle had been working at his pre-war trade as an auto mechanic and was working at the Salzburg water department at the time of his arrest. His crime confirmed in the 1943 "Höfle Telegram", in which he bragged of exterminating a total of 1,274,166 Jews in four camps during Operation Reinhard, Höfle would hang himself in a Vienna prison on August 21, 1962, before he could be put on trial.
The estimated cost of NASA Order HS-36, Atlas launch vehicles, was $51,504,000, of which definitive documents in the amount of $43,671,000 had been processed as of this date. NASA Order HS-44 for Redstone launch vehicles was $14,918,182 and $12,534,182 had been processed. On contract NAS 5-59, Mercury spacecraft, costs were $79,245,952, and approximately $9.5 million of this figure was classed as "Undefinitized Obligations."

Ham, a  male chimpanzee, was rocketed into space from Cape Canaveral aboard Mercury-Redstone 2, in a test of the Project Mercury capsule, thereby becoming the first hominid in space. During the powered phase of the flight, the thrust of the propulsion system was considerably higher than planned. In addition, the early depletion of the liquid oxygen caused a signal that separated the spacecraft from the launch vehicle a few seconds before planned. The over-acceleration of the launch vehicle coupled with the velocity of the escape rocket caused the spacecraft to attain a higher altitude and a longer range than planned. However, spacecraft recovery was effected, although there were some leaks, and the spacecraft was taking on water. Ham appeared to be in good physiological condition, but sometime later when he was shown the spacecraft it was visually apparent that he had no further interest in cooperating with the space flight program. Despite the over-acceleration factor, the flight was considered to be successful. Ham's 16-minute flight demonstrated to American NASA officials that the capsule could safely carry human astronauts into space.
As of this date, McDonnell had expended 2,616,387 man-hours in engineering; 383,561 man-hours in tooling, and 1,538,476 man-hours in production in support of Project Mercury.
The American State of Georgia, with the support of most of its residents, repealed its longstanding laws requiring segregation by race in its public schools. Governor S. Ernest Vandiver, in signing the "open schools package" of legislation, declared, "These are the four most important bills to be signed in this century in Georgia".
James Meredith, an African-American, applied for admission to the all-white University of Mississippi, beginning a legal action that would result in the desegregation of the university.

References

1961
1961-01
1961-01